The West Midland Railway was an early British railway company. It was formed on 1 July 1860 by a merger of several older railway companies and amalgamated with the Great Western Railway on 1 August 1863. It was the successor to the Oxford, Worcester and Wolverhampton Railway (OWWR).

History

Constituents
The original constituent companies were the Newport, Abergavenny and Hereford Railway (incorporated 1846 and opened 1854), the Worcester and Hereford Railway (inc 1853 and opened 1859), and the Oxford, Worcester and Wolverhampton Railway (inc 1845 and opened 1850); which had already absorbed the Stratford and Moreton Tramway (inc 1821 and opened 1826). 

On 1 July 1861 the WMR leased the Coleford, Monmouth, Usk and Pontypool Railway (inc 1853 and opened 1857). In 1862 it also leased the Leominster and Kington Railway (opened 1857) and the Severn Valley Railway (from opening).

Amalgamation with the GWR
The West Midland Railway was dissolved on 1 August 1863, with its powers and obligations being vested in the Great Western Railway. The West Midland Railway Company itself continued in existence until complete amalgamation was brought about by the Great Western Railway Act of 1872.

See also
 List of early British railway companies

References

Early British railway companies
Pre-grouping British railway companies
Railway companies established in 1860
Railway companies disestablished in 1863
1860 establishments in England
1863 disestablishments in the United Kingdom
British companies established in 1860
British companies disestablished in 1863
Great Western Railway constituents